The 2018 KNVB Cup Final was a football match between Feyenoord and AZ on 22 April 2018 at De Kuip, Rotterdam. It was the final match of the 2017–18 KNVB Cup competition and the 100th Dutch Cup Final. Feyenoord beat AZ 3–0 to secure their 13th KNVB Cup trophy. Remarkably, Feyenoord played all of their cup matches at home, including the final (which is traditionally played at their stadium) despite being drawn as the away team.

The match was halted for a while in the opening stage of the game due to AZ fans throwing smokebombs on the pitch.

Route to the final

Match

Details

See also
 Fireworks incident

References

2018
2017–18 in Dutch football
AZ Alkmaar matches
Feyenoord matches
April 2018 sports events in the Netherlands
Sports competitions in Rotterdam
21st century in Rotterdam